Leiostracus carnavalescus, or Harlequin Snail, is a species of tropical air-breathing land snail, a terrestrial pulmonate gastropod mollusc in the family Simpulopsidae.

This species is endemic to Brazil.

References

Simpulopsidae
Endemic fauna of Brazil
Gastropods described in 2016